Retinia teleopa is a species of moth of the family Tortricidae. It is found in China (Shanghai, Shaanxi).

References

Moths described in 1927
Eucosmini